Alice Fischer may refer to:

 Alice Fischer (figure skater)
 Alice Fischer (actress) (1869–1947), American actress

See also
Alice Fisher (disambiguation)